Manyana is a small town on the South Coast of New South Wales, Australia in the City of Shoalhaven. Manyana borders with Bendalong and Cunjurong Point.

Notes and references 

Towns in the South Coast (New South Wales)
City of Shoalhaven
Coastal towns in New South Wales